The year 2021 is the 12th year in the history of the Road Fighting Championship, a mma promotion based in South Korea. 2021 starts with ARC 004.

Road FC 2021 Awards 
The following fighters won the Road FC year-end awards for 2021:
Road FC Fighter of the Year 2021: In Soo Hwang
Road FC Submission of the Year 2021: Hae Jin Park against Soo Chul Kim 
Road FC Knockout of the Year 2021: Park Seung-Mo against Nandin-Erdene Munguntsooj and Shin Dong-Guk 
Road FC Rookie of the Year 2021: Jung Hyun Lee and Hyun Woo Kim

List of events

ARC 4 

AfreecaTV ROAD Championship ARC 4  was a mixed martial arts event scheduled to be held by Road FC on March 27, 2021, at the Lotte World Afreeca Colosseum, Lotte World Tower in Seoul, South Korea.

Background 

The main event featured rising heavyweight prospect Il Hak Oh fighting Jung Kyo Park.

Results

ARC 5

ARC 5 was a Combat sport event held by Road Fighting Championship on June 12, 2021 in Seoul, South Korea.

Background
Two undefeated lightweight prospects, Jung Hyun Lee and Jo Min Su were scheduled to fight in the main event.

In the co-main event, Jae Hyuk Heo was scheduled to fight Gi Hoon Ryu in an openweight bout.

Results

ROAD FC 58

ROAD FC 58 was a Combat sport event held by Road Fighting Championship on July 3, 2021 in Changwon, South Korea.

Background
It was announced that In Soo Hwang and Il Hak Oh would fight for the vacant ROAD FC Middleweight title.

The event featured an openweight bout between the South Korean actor Geum Kwang San and Jae Hoon Kim.

One-time Road FC featherweight title challenger Hae Jin Park was scheduled to meet Doo Seok Oh in the event's featured bout.

Won Jun Choi was scheduled to face Dong Hwan Lim at middleweight.

Two undefeated lightweights, Si Won Park and Tae Sung Kim, were scheduled to fight at this event.

Three additional fights were announced on June 2nd: a flyweight bout between Seo Dong Soo and Kim Woo Jae, a bantamweight bout between Yang Ji Yong and Lee Jung Hyun, as well as a featherweight bout between Lee Seong Ju and Park Jin.

Results

ROAD FC 59

ROAD FC 59 was a Combat sport event held by Road Fighting Championship on September 4, 2021 in Wonju, South Korea.

Background
A featherweight bout between Hae Jin Park and Soo Chul Kim for the vacant ROAD FC Featherweight title was scheduled as the event headliner.

A fight for the vacant ROAD FC Women's Atomweight title between Park Jeong-Eun and Shin Yu-Ri was scheduled as the co-main event.

A lightweight bout between Park Seung-Mo and Shin Dong-Guk was expected to take place at this event.

The undefeated flyweights, Jung Hyun Lee and Davron Kholmatov, were scheduled to face each other.

Six-fight Road FC veteran Gi-Won Ko was scheduled to face the eight-fight veteran Dae-Yeong Jang in a bantamweight bout.

Results

ARC 6

ARC 6 was a Combat sport event held by Road Fighting Championship on October 30, 2021 at the Lotte World Afreeca Colosseum, Lotte World Tower in Seoul, South Korea.

Background
The event was headlined by a 60kg catchweight bout between Jung Hyun Lee and Sergei Choi.

Results

See also 

 List of Road FC events
 List of Road FC champions
 List of current Road FC fighters
 List of current mixed martial arts champions

References 

Road Fighting Championship events
Road FC
Road FC
Road FC